Unification for Changes was a coalition in the Albanian parliamentary elections of 2009.

Coalition
Socialist Party of Albania (PS)
Social Democratic Party of Albania (PSD)
G99
Unity for Human Rights Party (PBDNJ)
Social Democracy Party of Albania (PDS)

References

Politics of Albania